Bernardo Silvano Bonezzi Nahón (6 July 1964 – 30 August 2012) was a Spanish film music composer who was born in Madrid. He won a Cinema Writers Circle Award for Bendito infierno, and was nominated for three Goya Awards and won one for his work on Nadie hablará de nosotras cuando hayamos muerto. He was a frequent collaborator of Pedro Almodóvar on his early films, having composed for five, before being succeeded by Alberto Iglesias.

He began his career as a member of the 1980s teen group "Los Zombies". They are best known for the song "Groenlandia", which is perhaps Bonezzi's most famous composition.

On the fifth anniversary of his death, the song "Fade to Black" was released as a tribute to him.  It was written and recorded by his long time friend, actress, singer Tres Hanley.

Bonezzi was found dead in his home on 30 August 2012. It is reported that his last Facebook posts to friends was “I'm fading to black”. Which is where the title of the song comes from.  The music video for "Fade To Black" features clips from Bonezzi’s home movies as well as clips with Los Zombies.

Filmography
Labyrinth of Passion (Laberinto de Pasiones) 1982
What Have I Done to Deserve This? (¿Qué he hecho yo para merecer esto?) 1984
Matador 1986
Law of Desire (La Ley del Deseo) 1987
Women on the Verge of a Nervous Breakdown (Mujeres al Borde de un Ataque de Nervios) 1988
All Tied Up 1994
Hi, Are You Alone? (Hola, ¿estás sola?) 1995
Nobody Will Speak of Us When We're Dead Nadie hablará de nosotras cuando hayamos muerto) 1995
Mouth to Mouth (Boca A Boca) 1995
Love Can Seriously Damage Your Health (El amor perjudica seriamente la salud) 1997
Don't Tempt Me (Bendito Infierno / Sin noticias de Dios in Spanish / No News From God) 2001
Off Key (Desafinado) 2001

References

External links

1964 births
2012 suicides
20th-century Spanish male musicians
Male film score composers
Musicians from Madrid
Spanish film score composers
Suicides in Spain
Spanish agnostics
LGBT history in Spain
LGBT-related suicides
Spanish gay musicians
Gay composers
21st-century Spanish LGBT people